Manuchekhr Firdavsiyevich Safarov ((), born 31 May 2001) is a Tajikistani professional footballer who plays as a right-back for Uzbekistan Super League club Lokomotiv Tashkent.

Club career

Khujand 

On 12 July 2019, Safarov signed for FK Khujand on loan from Futsal club Sipar Khujand.

Lokomotiv Pamir 

On 1 August 2020, Safarov left Khujand to sign for Lokomotiv-Pamir.

Istiklol 

On 29 March 2021, Safarov signed for FC Istiklol.

Persepolis 

On 7 November 2021, Safarov left Istiklol with Vahdat Hanonov to sign for Iranian club Persepolis, on a contract until 30 June 2024. On 17 January 2022, Safarov made his debut in a 3–0 away win against Zob Ahan Esfahan.

Lokomotiv Tashkent 
On 20 July 2022, Lokomotiv Tashkent announced the signing of Safarov.

International career 
Safarov made his senior team debut on 10 September 2019 against Mongolia.

Career statistics

Club

International 

Statistics accurate as of match played 17 November 2022

Honours 

Istiklol
 Tajik Supercup (1): 2021

Persepolis
Iranian Super Cup Runner-up (1): 2021

Tajikistan
King's Cup: 2022

References

External links 
 
 

2001 births
Living people
Tajikistani footballers
Tajikistan international footballers
Association football defenders
Tajikistan Higher League players
Persepolis F.C. players
Persian Gulf Pro League players